Meta Akkus is a French–Turkish film director, screenwriter, author, and producer. She is best known for her fantasy family film Make A Wish (Bir Dilek Tut)

Early life 
Meta Akkus, born in Turkey, grew up in Paris, France. She went to Middle School Béranger, located in Le Marais, as such predominantly attended by Jewish students. There she joined the school's theater and studied acting for the next seven years, performing in different classical plays.

In the last year of middle school, Akkus was assigned, by her history teacher, to direct a documentary about World War II students that were deported to concentration camps from her school, Beranger, in 1940.

At the age of 17, Akkus dropped out of Henri-Bergson high school in Paris, put her acting on hold, to write and direct her first play, "Le Temps N'Existe Pas".

Akkus directs her first short film, La Solitude, at the age of 18. This led her to move to London, to study and work in films.

Film career 
In London, Akkus attended directing classes at Panico Film, she then continued at Central St Martins. She worked as a runner on the set of the James Bond film, The World Is Not Enough, directed by Michael Apted

Her next assignment as an assistant director working on various productions including an advertising campaign for Micron PC, directed by Terry Gilliam, for Radical Media.

She learned how to edit films at Swordfish Editing in Soho, working as an assistant editor for over a year, where she produced, directed, and edited her second short film, Unsatisfaction on 35mm. This short was bought by Canal+ for television broadcast.

BBD Productions, Paris signed her as one of their three exclusive commercial directors, the other two being Luc Besson and Jean-Paul Goude. At BBD, Akkus directed many commercials and music videos around the world, for such global Luxury Brands as Chanel, Lux, Evian, Mini Cooper, Paşabahçe, BP, and Pınar.

Meta Akkus participated in the 5th International Izmir Short Film Festival in November 2004 with her short films La Peur, Zero Tues and Unsatisfaction.

In Cape Town, Akkus directed advertisements for Group Saur, where she created a whole African village and showed people carrying water from every corner of the Earth to Africa.

In 2009–2010, Akkus directed the interview scenes in the documentary, Turkish Passport, about World War II, Turkish-Jewish survivors.

Akkus started and directed a music video for a Copenhagen based pop trio band Who Made Who for their song.

She is the author of two published books, in Turkey, Aşktan Ötürü and Abrakadabra.

Akkus directed four music videos for the Turkish rock singer, "Kiraç". For whom, she wrote and directed a short film for his song "Senden Başka" a story about a boy's love for his mother, which airs on Turkish Television Channels every year on Mother's Day.

Meta Akkus wrote, produced, and directed her first feature film "Make A Wish" (Bir Dilek Tut) in 2022. Make A Wish, a magical coming-of-age film, for family audiences, telling the story of a 12-year-old boy "Berke" who uncovers the secret of how to make his wishes come true . She started pre-production in Istanbul. She shot it in Mardin, an ancient Roman town near the Turkish border with Syria. Her film "Make a Wish" Bir Dilek Tut is a semi-finalist at Flickers’ Rhode Island International Film Festival (RIIFF).

Filmography

Feature films

Short films

Commercials

Further reading 
 Aşktan Ötürü (2016). Meta Akkuş.RETRO BASIM YAYIN.volume 160. release date:2016-02-22. 
 Abrakadabra (2018). Meta Akkuş.THE BEST FILMS PRODUCTIONS.volume 116. release date:2018-06-19.

References

External links 
 

Living people
1980 births
21st-century Turkish women writers
Turkish women film directors
Turkish female screenwriters
21st-century Turkish screenwriters